The 1949 New Mexico A&M Aggies football team was an American football team that represented New Mexico College of Agriculture and Mechanical Arts (now known as New Mexico State University) as a member of the Border Conference during the 1949 college football season.  In their second year under head coach Vaughn Corley, the Aggies compiled a 4–6 record (1–4 against conference opponents), finished seventh in the conference, and were outscored by a total of 315 to 265. The team played its home games on Quesenberry Field.

Schedule

References

New Mexico AandM
New Mexico State Aggies football seasons
New Mexico AandM Aggies football